Marco Papiro is a Swiss-Italian experimental musician, electronic music producer, sound artist and graphic designer born in Basel, Switzerland

Biography
Classically trained from early age, he played violin, synthesizer and bass guitar in several bands before creating and releasing his own self-produced music as Papiro. His influences are numerous and audible: drone, minimal, folk from all times and places, psychedelic, contemporary classical, industrial – but also easy listening, pop and even new age music. His compositions are generally instrumental, meditative and hypnotic, but at times also bizarre and humorous. Papiro is a multi-instrumentalist with a fondness for synthesizers from the pre-programmable era – the EMS VCS3, the Moog Sonic Six, the Roland Jupiter 4 and the Serge Modular among others.

Marco Papiro has collaborated with various musicians such as Mani Neumeier, Hans Koch or Gyða Valtýsdóttir, and has been a „sound carrier“ for Damo Suzuki on several occasions. He is also a regular guest with Swiss garage-psych band Roy & the Devil's Motorcycle. In 2005 he founded the noise band Mir, together with Daniel Buess and Michael Zaugg (later also Marlon McNeill and Yanik Soland). Until Daniel Buess' death in 2016, the band played over a hundred shows in Europe, Brazil and Japan. As a producer he has initiated the re-release of "Herzschlag Erde / Verdunkelt die Sinne" and "Die singende Sternlaterne / Folklore des Weltalls 1982" by Swiss underground musician and outsider artist "Die Welttraumforscher", of whom he is a big admirer.

Papiro is also active as an unorthodox DJ. Together with Markus Stähli of Roy & the Devil's Motorcycle they host a monthly night were they expand their eclectic sets by using various speeds, additional instruments, prepared tapes and effects.

Marco Papiro has studied graphic design at the Basel School of Design from 1995 to 1999. As a graphic designer Marco Papiro is mostly known for the posters and album covers he has created for related artists such as Sun Araw, Spacemen 3 / Spectrum(with Peter Kember aka Sonic Boom), Panda Bear, Z'EV, Antoine Chessex, Oren Ambarchi and many others. He teaches at the Basel School of Design since 2006.

Discography

  Papiro, Papiro aka Leaf album (2002) – Not on label, re-released as TREE008
  Avventure lontane (2006) – A Tree in a Field Records TREE017 / Some Fine Legacy SFL 005
  The Ghost Album (2006) – Interdisco ID16
  Rev (2010) – A Tree in a Field Records TREE028 / Some Fine Legacy SFL006
  Negativ White 2 (2012) – A Tree in a Field Records TREE035
  People on a Bridge (2014) – A Tree in a Field Records TREE050
  Teopatia (2014) – Planam PLANAM P
 Automare (2017) – Muscut, MUSCUT 7 (2012)
  Roy & the Devil's Motorcycle:  Water Air Food & Love (2010) – Not on Label
  Roy & the Devil's Motorcycle : Tino: Frozen Angel OST (2014) – Voodoo Rhythm 
  Compilation several tracks with Roy & the Devil's Motorcycle: Live at the Jolt Festival Basel (2014) – A Tree in a Field Records
  MIR  Ex Modules (2005) – A Tree in a Field Records 
  MIR, MIR(2009) – A Tree in a Field Records 
  MIR  Abandon Ship (2009) – A Tree in a Field Records
  MIR Shock Your Moneymaker (2013) – A Tree in a Field Records TREE039
  Rise (2019) – Solar Ipse Audio House SIAH06

Publications
 Basler Kulturplakate 2001–2009 – Basler Plakatsammlung (2009)
 Min: The New Simplicity in Graphic Design – Thames & Hudson (2016) 
 Prints and Drinks 3 – Typographie kann unter Umständen lesbar sein – Prints and Drinks (2016) Schwabe Verlag,

Sources

External links 
 Marco Papiro Website
 Papiro Interview in It`s Nice That
 Papiro portrait in Yorokobu (in Spanish)
 Marco Papiro at discogs 
 Papiro at allmusic
 Marco Papiro graphic designer at allmusic

Swiss bass guitarists
Male bass guitarists
Sound artists
21st-century Swiss musicians
Living people
1975 births
Musicians from Basel-Stadt
21st-century bass guitarists
21st-century male musicians